Kuźnica Grabowska is a village in the administrative district of Gmina Kraszewice, within Ostrzeszów County, Greater Poland Voivodeship, in west-central Poland.

The village has a population of 544.

References

Villages in Ostrzeszów County